

259001–259100 

|-bgcolor=#f2f2f2
| colspan=4 align=center | 
|}

259101–259200 

|-bgcolor=#f2f2f2
| colspan=4 align=center | 
|}

259201–259300 

|-bgcolor=#f2f2f2
| colspan=4 align=center | 
|}

259301–259400 

|-id=344
| 259344 Paré || 2003 GQ || Ambroise Paré (1510–1590), a French surgeon and one of the fathers of modern surgery || 
|-id=387
| 259387 Atauta ||  || Atauta, a village located in the Ribera del Duero wine making region in the province of Soria, Spain || 
|}

259401–259500 

|-bgcolor=#f2f2f2
| colspan=4 align=center | 
|}

259501–259600 

|-bgcolor=#f2f2f2
| colspan=4 align=center | 
|}

259601–259700 

|-bgcolor=#f2f2f2
| colspan=4 align=center | 
|}

259701–259800 

|-bgcolor=#f2f2f2
| colspan=4 align=center | 
|}

259801–259900 

|-bgcolor=#f2f2f2
| colspan=4 align=center | 
|}

259901–260000 

|-id=905
| 259905 Vougeot ||  || Vougeot, a Burgundy village situated between Beaune and Dijon, France || 
|}

References 

259001-260000